Arizona's 24th Legislative District is one of 30 in the state, situated in Maricopa County. As of 2021, there are 40 precincts in the district, with a total registered voter population of 128,958. The district has an overall population of 230,206.

Political representation
The district is represented for the 2021–2022 Legislative Session in the State Senate by Lela Alston (D) and in the House of Representatives by Jennifer Longdon (D) and Amish Shah (D).

References

Maricopa County, Arizona
Arizona legislative districts